Peter Justin Stoykewych (born July 14, 1992) is a Canadian former professional ice hockey defenseman and current American Hockey League (AHL) linesman. He most notably played for and served as captain with the Manitoba Moose of the AHL after being drafted by the Atlanta Thrashers in the 2010 NHL Entry Draft.

Early life
Stoykewych was born on July 14, 1992, in Winnipeg, Manitoba to parents Andrew and Sheryl Stoykewych. His father serves on the staff of the Department of Surgery at the Health Sciences Centre and the Faculty of Dentistry at the University of Manitoba. Stoykewych is the middle child of three brothers, Adam and Paul, who also played hockey.

Playing career

Junior
Growing up in Manitoba, Stoykewych played in the Assiniboine Park Minor Hockey Association with the Bantam AA Assiniboine Park Rangers and Bantam AAA Winnipeg Monarchs. Following this, he joined the Midget AAA Winnipeg Wild where he won the Top Defenceman Award during the month of October 2007. Stoykewych also played for the Manitoba Junior Hockey League’s Winnipeg Blues before being drafted by the Des Moines Buccaneers in the United States Hockey League (USHL).

He was selected by the Atlanta Thrashers in the seventh round, 199th overall, of the 2010 NHL Entry Draft, ultimately becoming the Thrashers' final ever draft pick before their relocation to Winnipeg, Manitoba to become the Winnipeg Jets. Despite his draft selection, Stoykewych opted to join the Colorado College Tigers to play four seasons of collegiate hockey.

Professional
In 2014, Stoykewych joined the American Hockey League's St. John's IceCaps, now the Manitoba Moose, in 2014 on a two-year contract.  He signed one-year contracts with the Moose in 2016 and 2017, and signed another two-year contract in July 2018. 

Prior to the start of the 2018–19 season, Stoykewych was named the captain of the Moose alongside alternatives JC Lipon and Cameron Schilling. On January 18, 2019, Stoykewych was suspended two games by the AHL as a result of an illegal check to the head on Milwaukee Admirals forward Phil Di Giuseppe. During the game, he had been assessed a two-minute minor penalty. Following his fifth season with the Moose and second as captain, Stoykewych announced his retirement from professional hockey on June 9, 2020, after the cancellation of the 2019–20 season due to the COVID-19 pandemic. At the time of his retirement, he ranked 10th amongst the teams' defencemen in games played with 267. Following his retirement, he was hired by the AHL as a linesman for the 2020–21 season.

Career statistics

Awards and honours

References

External links

1992 births
Living people
Atlanta Thrashers draft picks
Canadian ice hockey officials
Colorado College Tigers men's ice hockey players
Des Moines Buccaneers players
Manitoba Moose players
Ice hockey people from Winnipeg
St. John's IceCaps players
Winnipeg South Blues players
Canadian ice hockey defencemen